Jump the Queue is a board game published in 1989 by J. W. Spears.

Contents 
Jump the Queue is a game in which each player attempts to move five different vehicles through a queue of traffic.

Reception 
Ian Livingstone reviewed Jump the Queue for Games International magazine, and gave it 3 1/2 stars out of 5, and stated that "The quality of the components is good, as are the graphics."

References

Board games introduced in 1989